June Marcia Griffith (married Collison) (born June 16, 1957) is a retired Guyanese track and field athlete. She participated in both sprint and jumping events. She represented Guyana in the 400 meters at the 1984 Olympics, making it to the semi-final round before finishing a non-qualifying 5th place in her semi final behind the eventual gold (Valerie Brisco-Hooks) and bronze (Kathy Smallwood-Cook) medalists.

She was the 400 metres gold medalist at the 1982 Central American and Caribbean Games. She was also a silver medalist at the 1979 Pan American Games, losing to Sharon Dabney in a photo finish in the 400 metres and a bronze medalist in the long jump at the 1978 Commonwealth Games.

She married Dennis Collison, also a Guyanese sprinter. They are the parents of NBA basketball player Darren Collison. She originally came to the United States on a track scholarship to Adelphi University. After earning her MBA, she was CFO for the now closed St. Luke Medical Center in Sierra Madre, California. She is now COO of the Arrowhead Regional Medical Center.

References

Living people
1957 births
Olympic athletes of Guyana
Guyanese female sprinters
Guyanese female long jumpers
Athletes (track and field) at the 1984 Summer Olympics
Adelphi Panthers women's track and field athletes
Pan American Games silver medalists for Guyana
Pan American Games medalists in athletics (track and field)
Athletes (track and field) at the 1979 Pan American Games
Athletes (track and field) at the 1983 Pan American Games
Commonwealth Games bronze medallists for Guyana
Commonwealth Games medallists in athletics
Athletes (track and field) at the 1978 Commonwealth Games
Athletes (track and field) at the 1982 Commonwealth Games
Central American and Caribbean Games gold medalists for Guyana
Competitors at the 1982 Central American and Caribbean Games
World Athletics Championships athletes for Guyana
Afro-Guyanese people
Central American and Caribbean Games medalists in athletics
Medalists at the 1979 Pan American Games
Medallists at the 1978 Commonwealth Games